Rhododendron schlippenbachii, the royal azalea, is a species of Rhododendron native to the Korean Peninsula and adjacent regions of Manchuria (Liaoning, Nei Mongol), Japan, and the Russian Far East. It is the dominant understory shrub in many Korean hillside forests, growing at  altitude.

The flowers are white to pink, often with small red spots on the upper three petals; they are produced in late spring to early summer.

The scientific name schlippenbachii is derived from Baron von Schlippenbach, a Russian officer who collected the species in 1854.

Cultivation and symbolism
In Korea, it is called cheoljjuk (철쭉) and if the color of the petals is white, the flower is called huincheoljjuk (흰철쭉). The Royal Azalea is commonly chosen as a local symbol in South Korea, by provinces, cities and counties such as Gangwon Province, Gapyeong and Miryang.

It is widely cultivated in many parts of the world; some cultivars bear white flowers. Azaleas are poisonous and can not be eaten.

References
Flora of China: Rhododendron schlippenbachii
Royal azalea festival of Mount Yeonin
UConn Plant Database entry

schlippenbachii
Flora of Northeast Asia
Flora of Korea
Flora of Japan
Flora of China
Flora of Russia